Carolein Smit (born 1960) is a Dutch ceramic art sculptor whose work often includes animals or skeletons.

Life and education

Smit was born on 22 October 1960 in Amersfoort. She was educated at the  AKV St. Joost in Breda from 1979 to 1984, studying graphics and lithography.<ref name=CV>{{cite web|title=Carolein Smit CV |publisher=Flatland Gallery |url=http://www.flatlandgallery.com/index.php5?a=artists&id=7&s=cv |archive-url=https://web.archive.org/web/20150402173403/http://www.flatlandgallery.com/index.php5?a=artists&id=7&s=cv |archive-date=2015-04-02 |url-status=dead }}</ref> For the next thirteen years she works as an illustration artist for various magazines and newspapers until a 3-months residency at the European Ceramic Work Center (ECWC) in  Den Bosch  in 1995 during which she falls in love with clay. As of this moment, she chooses  ceramics  as her favorite medium of expression and employs transgressive beauty that contradicts commonly held convictions about what makes something appealing. Her fascination with contrasts: the ugly but adorable, or the frightening but fragile, provides a reminder about the vulnerability and impermanence of life, and the inevitability of death.

Career
Smit is known for figurative "enigmatic sculptures" depicting ceramic animals like dogs, hares or rats.  Her sculptures satirically play with the emotions such as hate, love, exuberance, alienation and unresolved emotions, using highly imaginative representations of skeletons, cats or babies. She creates characters with over active sentiment, inspired by themes from classic mythology and biblical tales, such as greed, power and impotence, perishability and death.  Her sculptures are rich in symbolism and she often uses elements familiar to vanities, such as skulls, skeletons, small bones of animals. Much like in the 16th and 17th century Dutch Golden Age Vanitas paintings, that were a type of symbolic artwork especially associated with still life painting in Flanders and the Netherlands, her work is meant to symbolise temporary presence but with a touch of irony.

Three of Smit's works are in the collection of the Victoria and Albert Museum in London, the world's largest museum of the decorative arts.
In 2003, she had a solo exhibition at the Keramion, a ceramics museum and center in Frechen, Germany. In 2010, over 60 of her sculptures were on display in a solo exhibition at the Kunsthal museum in Rotterdam. The exhibition lasted over three months and was the first major retrospective of her work. A review of the exhibition in Beelden Magazine stated that Smit produces "striking ceramic sculptures in which a bizarre baroque figuration results in contemporary, quirky images".

Technics
Carolein Smit uses white clay that contains very little chamotte in order to not having granular material on the surface of her works. The sculptures are hollow, with slabs of clay, and hand-modeled. Pieces like the hare with an umbrella and animals that have hairs are all made separately by hand and added one by one. The pieces are very fragile when not yet fired at 1020 degrees, but relatively strong when glazed, as everything sticks with the glaze in between.

Cabinet of curiosities
The cabinet of curiosities which has been considered as the first museum, was the place where the collectors showed their objects that sometimes could be weird or even terrifying.
The creation of Carolein Smit expresses her love for the cabinet of curiosities. She is obsessed with the multiple aspects shown in this type of collection which contains all images related to art but also to the scientific and other broader areas. The exceptional, strange, and rare objects reveal the supernatural to restrain the whims of nature. For the ceramist, these pieces suggest order and warn us of the future chaos at the same time. Their images are served to scare people and also to confine the fear. Carolein seeks to demonstrate in her ceramics this ambivalence that makes the viewer look with admire and disgust at the same time.

Bestiary
The bestiary is the theme that often occurs in the cabinet of curiosities, and also frequents Smit's artworks. The dogs, rabbits, sheeps, monkeys, owls, etc. are all given a glittering skin which makes them the unreal and attractive. Smit works also carefully with the details, like the eyes and the fur of her raptors, rats and pugs. In her exhibition at Musée de la Chasse et de la Nature in Paris, Dents ! Crocs ! Griffes !, her animals are being gathered and thus the visitors can see and "read" the bestiary of Carolein Smit.

Anatomical Figures
The cabinet of curiosities is a place where the art and the science confront each other and are harmonized. Medical oddities, tumors, anatomical and pathological specimens can all be found in the cabinets. Inspired by this way of collecting and showing objects, Smit creates numerous skeletons and skinned figures as a demonstration of the combination of art and science, beautiful and dreadful.

Biblical Scenes
Smit once said that not only she treated anatomical objects as source of her inspiration, but also she took regularly the devotion and biblical scenes as image for her ceramics. The figures can be monstrous and at the same time like someone coaxing and appealing. They are the talismans that keep us from misfortune and death.

Exhibitions
Museum exhibitions

2022
 Dents ! Crocs ! Griffes !,  Musée de la Chasse et de la Nature  à Paris, Paris, France
 Secret Garden, with Gebroeders Miedema,  Stedelijk Museum Kampen, Netherlands

2021Les Flammes : L'Âge de la Céramique,  Musée d'Art Moderne de Paris, Paris, France

2020
 Bye Bye Future! L'art de voyager dans le temps, Musée royal de Mariemont, Belgium

2019

 Zarte Flügel, dicke Brummer, Museum Keramion, Frechen, Germany
 Raketstart, Stedelijk Museum Breda, Breda, Netherlands
 Drents Museum à Assen, Netherlans

2018
 L'amour fou,  Grassi Museum, Leipzig, Germany
 Myth and Mortality, The fairytale world of Carolein Smit,  Victoria and Albert museum, London, United Kingdom

2016
 Sexy Ceramics, Museum het Princessenhof, Leeuwarden, Netherlands
 Ceramix, Bonnefantenmuseum, Maastricht, Allemagne & La Maison Rouge, Paris, France

2015

 Skeletten, Museum Beelden aan Zee, Scheveningen, Netherlands
 Queensize - Female Artists from the Olbricht Collection, Arnhems Museum, Netherlands

Exhibitions

2022
 FRAGILES, Galerie Da-End, Paris, France
 Eden, James Freeman Gallery, Londres, United Kingdom
 Μέδουσα / Medusa, Galerie Da-End, Paris, France
 Bloodhound & Friends, Galerie Fontana, Amsterdam, Netherlands
 Cabinet de céramique contemporaine, Jonathan F. Kugel, Brussels, Belgium
 Cabinet Da-End XI - Asile in wonderland, Galerie Da-End, Paris, France

2021
 Nyctophilia, James Freeman Gallery, Londres, United Kingdom
 Cabinet Da-End X, Galerie Da-End, Paris, France

2020
 Beyond the vessel, Messums Wiltshire, Tisbury, United Kingdom
 Vanitas, Tiendschuur, Tegelen, Netherlands

2019
 Beyond the vessel, Mesher, Istanbul, Turkey
 The child in me, Istanbul Biennale, Turkey
 Vanitas, Tiendschuur, Tegelen, Netherlands
 Galeristes, with Galerie Da-End, Carreau du Temple, Paris, France

2018
 Carolein Smit and Ray Caesar, James Freeman Gallery, London, United Kingdom
 TEFAF, with Galerie Patrice Trigano de Paris (theme: The Body), Maastricht
 TEFAF, with Galerie Michael Haas de Berlin, Maastricht

2017
 Paizô, duo show with Mike MacKeldey, Galerie Da-End, Paris, France
 Galeristes, with Galerie Da-End, Carreau du Temple, Paris, France
 Cabinet Da-End VII, Galerie Da-End, Paris, France
 Art Paris, avec Flatland Gallery d'Amsterdam, Paris, France
 First Biennale of De heilige Driehoek, Oosterhout, Pays-Bas

2016
 Galeristes, with Galerie Da-End, Carreau du Temple, Paris, France
 Golem, Carolein Smit (Solo Show), Galerie Michèle Hayem, Paris, France
 Cabinet Da-End VI, Galerie Da-End, Paris, France
 Omnia vanitas, WCC-BF Gallery, Les Anciens Abattoirs, Mons, Belgique

2015
 Lʼamour fou (Solo Show), Flatland Gallery, Amsterdam, Pays-Bas
 Objectif Terre'', Biennale internationale de Céramique de Châteauroux, Châteauroux, France

Collections
Grassimuseum, Leipzig, Germany
Olbricht Collection, Germany
Reydon Weiss Collection, Bremen, Germany
Asante Collection, Basel, Switzerland
Bouwfonds, Hoevelaken, Netherlands
Knoll Design Nederland, Netherlands
Interpolis, Tilburg, Netherlands
FSGroep, Hilversum, Netherlands
Collection Eneco Energie, Rotterdam, Netherlands
Collection J. Schwartz, New York, USA
Victoria and Albert Museum, London, United Kingdom
Badisches Landesmuseum, Karlsruhe, Germany
Scheringa Museum for Realism, Spanbroek, Netherlands
Museum Beelden aan Zee, Scheveningen, Netherlands
Fuled International Museum (FLICAM) Fuping, China
Drents Museum, Assen, Netherlands
Collection Ömer Koç, Istanbul, Turkey
Source:

References

External links
Official site

1960 births
Living people
Dutch sculptors
People from Amersfoort